Frailea phaeodisca is a species of Frailea from Brazil and Uruguay.

References

External links
 
 

phaeodisca
Cacti of Mexico
Endemic flora of Mexico